Lower Kachura Lake, also known as Shangrila Lake, is a lake located near the city of Skardu in Gilgit−Baltistan, Pakistan.

Shangrila Resort
Shangrila was established in 1983 with the opening of the first resort hotel in Skardu. The Shangrila Resort Hotel was founded by Muhammad Aslam Khan Afridi, a Pakistani military officer who served as the first commander of the Northern Scouts of the Pakistan Army. The resort is known for its restaurant that is built on the fuselage of a nearby crashed aircraft.

Shangrila was named after Shangri-La, an idyllic Himalayan paradise described in the 1933 novel Lost Horizon by British writer James Hilton. In the novel, Hilton narrates a tale in which the surviving passengers of an early-1920s airplane crash encounter a group of Buddhist monks from a nearby temple, who answer the passengers' call for help and take them to a lamasery filled with a variety of fruits and flowers; the monks claim to be hundreds of years old, but appear youthful in their appearance. The seemingly earthly paradise is referred to as Shangri-La, a Tibetan-language word meaning "heaven on Earth".

References

External links

Lakes of Gilgit-Baltistan
Resorts in Pakistan